Psaphida styracis, the fawn sallow, is a moth of the family Noctuidae. The species was first described by Achille Guenée in 1852. It is found in the eastern parts of North America, and has been imported to the United Kingdom.

The wingspan is about 1.2-1.4 inches, or 31–37 millimeters. The moth flies from March to May depending on the location. There is one generation per year.

The larvae feed on Quercus species.

External links
Species info
Images
Larval stage info

Psaphida
Moths of North America
Moths described in 1852